The 2022 FIFA Club World Cup final was the final match of the 2022 FIFA Club World Cup, an international club football tournament hosted by Morocco. It was the 19th final of the FIFA Club World Cup, a FIFA-organised tournament between the club champions from each of the six continental confederations, as well as the host nation's league champions.

The match was played at the Prince Moulay Abdellah Stadium in Rabat on 11 February 2023. It was contested by Spanish club Real Madrid, representing UEFA as the reigning champions of the UEFA Champions League, and Saudi Arabian club Al-Hilal, representing the AFC.

Real Madrid won the match 5–3 for their fifth FIFA Club World Cup title and eighth club world championship. With eight goals, the match was the highest scoring final in Club World Cup history.

Teams
In the following table, the finals until 2005 were in the FIFA Club World Championship era, and since 2006 in the FIFA Club World Cup era.

Al-Hilal became the third Asian club to reach the Club World Cup final in the 19th edition of the tournament. They are also the first AFC nominee to do so, as the Asian appearances in the 2016 and 2018 finals were both the club of the host association.

Note: On 27 October 2017, FIFA officially recognised all the champions of the Intercontinental Cup as club world champions, in equal status to the FIFA Club World Cup.
IC: Intercontinental Cup (1960–2004)
FCWC: FIFA Club World Cup finals (2000, 2005–present)

Route to the final

Match

Details

Statistics

Notes

References

External links

Final
2022
Real Madrid CF matches
Al Hilal SFC matches
2022–23 in Spanish football
2022–23 in Saudi Arabian football
2022–23 in Moroccan football
Sport in Rabat
21st century in Rabat